Hossein Atashparvar was born in Disfan, Gonabad, Khorasan Province, on 11 November 1952. He is an Iranian writer and a literary critic. He belongs to the Third Generation of Iranian writers. He is the fiction editor of the international literary magazine Neweshta.

He was one of the speakers at the Commemoration of Omar Khayyam, held on 18 May 2014.
His research on Omar Khayyam suggests that Khayyam as mathematician, employed the least vocabularies and simplest words to express his thoughts in his work. Therefore, his work resembles the short story style of our time.
He is one of the Juries at the Mehregan Adab.[ مهرگان ادب]

By creative employment of Gonabad's folklore such as dialect, culture, traditions, ceremonies, and myths in his short story collections "Mahi dar bad" (Fish in the wind) and "Anduh" (Sarrow), as well as in his novel "Khiyaban-e Bahar abi bud" (Bahar avenue was blue), Hossein Atashparvar presents a portrait of the people living in this region to the Iraninan literature. To honor Atashparvar's contribution and to employ his expertise, the Gonabad's literature association has been renamed to "Hossein Atashparvar's House of fiction".

Atashparvar started to write before 1970s. His first short stories were published in 1972 by Khorasan Newspaper. The first book which presented his work among other authors such as Mahmoud Dowlatabadi and Asghar Abdollahi, was a short story collection called "Dariche tazeh" published in 1983.
In 2011 "Mahi dar bad" (Fish in the wind) which is his last published short story collection earned him the Simin Daneshvar golden plate award  In 2015 he published "Khaneh sewom-e dastan" which explores the structure and form in the selected short stories written by the third generation of Iranian writers

Works

 1990, "Khabgard and other stories" (with works of other writers such as Houshang Golshiri, Ghazi Rabihavi)
 1993, short story collection "Anduh" (sarrow)
 2005, "Khiyaban-e Bahar abi bud"
 2009, "Kuzeh-ha dar jost-o-juyeh Kuzeh-gar" (on Khayyam)
 2010,  short story collection "Mahi dar bad" (Fish in the wind)
 2015, "Khaneh sewom-e Dastan"

References 

Living people
People from Khorasan
1952 births
Iranian male writers
Iranian male short story writers